The champions and runners-up of the Wimbledon Championships Ladies' Doubles tournament, first introduced to the championship in 1913. From 1915 to 1918, and from 1940 to 1945, no competition was held due to the two World Wars.

Finalists

Amateur Era

Open Era

See also

Wimbledon other competitions
List of Wimbledon gentlemen's singles champions
List of Wimbledon gentlemen's doubles champions
List of Wimbledon ladies' singles champions
List of Wimbledon mixed doubles champions

Grand Slam women's doubles
List of Australian Open women's doubles champions
List of French Open women's doubles champions
List of US Open women's doubles champions
List of Grand Slam women's doubles champions

References

External links
 Ladies' doubles champions and runners-up at the official Championships website

Ladies
Wimbledon
Women's tennis in the United Kingdom
Wimbledon